The  was one of the four houses of the powerful Fujiwara clan, the other three being the Nanke, Kyōke and Shikike. The Hokke were the de facto rulers of Japan through their hereditary position as imperial regents (Sesshō and Kampaku). In the Kamakura period, it split into the Five regent houses, who continued to monopolize the regency from the 12th century until 1868. After the Meiji Restoration, these houses were appointed Duke in the new hereditary peerage.

History 
The Hokke was founded by Fujiwara no Fusasaki, the second son of Fujiwara no Fuhito, in the Heian period. Fusasaki had three brothers: Muchimaro, Maro and Umakai, and these four brothers are known for having established the "four houses" of the Fujiwara; the Hokke, Nanke, Kyōke and Shikike.

During the time of Fujiwara no Fuyutsugu, the Hokke became prosperous after Fuyutsugu was appointed kurōdo-no-tō (Head Chamberlain). His son Fujiwara no Yoshifusa became the first sesshō (regent in the place of a child Emperor), and his son, Fujiwara no Mototsune, became kampaku (regent in the place of an adult Emperor). After that, members of the Hokke continued to have a strong relationship with the Imperial Family by marrying Hokke daughters to the emperors. This allowed them to exclude other families and monopolize the regent position.

The Hokke prospered during the time of Fujiwara no Michinaga and Yorimichi. In the Kamakura period, Hokke split into the Five regent houses, Konoe, Takatsukasa, Kujō, Ichijō, and Nijō. These families continued to monopolize the regency until the Meiji Restoration in 1868. When the regency was abolished, a new hereditary peerage (kazoku) was established, and these houses were all appointed as Duke.

Notable members 

 Murasaki Shikibu
 Fujiwara no Teika
 Fujiwara no Michinaga
 Fujiwara no Fuyutsugu
 Fujiwara no Yoshifusa
 Fujiwara no Mototsune
 Fujiwara no Tokihira
 Fujiwara no Atsutada
 Fujiwara no Sukemasa
 Fujiwara no Kintō
 Fujiwara no Kiyosuke
 Lady Ise
 Fujiwara no Michitsuna's mother
 Fujiwara no Michimasa
 Fujiwara no Koretada
 Fujiwara no Yoshitaka
 Fujiwara no Yorimichi
 Fujiwara no Yukinari
 Fujiwara no Sanekata
 Fujiwara no Sadayori
 Fujiwara no Ietaka
 Fujiwara no Mototoshi
 Fujiwara no Sadakata
 Fujiwara no Asatada
 Fujiwara no Tadamichi
 Fujiwara no Sadanaga
 Fujiwara no Atsuyori

See also
 Northern Fujiwara
 Nanke (Fujiwara)
 Shikike
 Kyōke

Notes

References
 Brinkley, Frank and Dairoku Kikuchi. (1915). A History of the Japanese People from the Earliest Times to the End of the Meiji Era. New York: Encyclopædia Britannica. OCLC 413099
 Nussbaum, Louis-Frédéric and Käthe Roth. (2005). Japan Encyclopedia. Cambridge: Harvard University Press. ;  OCLC 58053128

Fujiwara clan
Japanese clans